Rudolf Hieronymus Petersen (30 December 1878 in Hamburg – 10 September 1962 in Wentorf bei Hamburg) was a German businessman, politician (CDU) and First Mayor of Hamburg (1945–46).

Petersen's brother Carl Wilhelm Petersen was head of Hamburg's government (first mayor) between 1924 and 1929 and again from 1932 to 1933. Their grandfather Carl Friedrich Petersen had officiated as first mayor several terms, last until his death in 1892. In 1911, Rudolf Petersen founded the business Rudolf Petersen und Co. — after several mergers today MPC Capital AG. In May 1945 after the World War II, Brigadier General  — Military Governor of Hamburg — appointed Petersen mayor of Hamburg. Petersen joined the CDU. In 1946, he was followed by Max Brauer, who was elected as the First Mayor, and Petersen remained member of the Hamburg Parliament until 1949.

References

External links

 
 Business website MPC Capital AG 
 

1878 births
1962 deaths
Mayors of Hamburg
Christian Democratic Union of Germany politicians
Knights Commander of the Order of Merit of the Federal Republic of Germany